The Numark TTUSB is a belt-driven turntable with a USB audio interface. This allows the user to transfer music from a record onto a computer, from which it can then be burnt onto an audio CD. Introduced in December 2005, the TTUSB was the first turntable of its kind to have been released to the consumer market. A near-identical model called the iTTUSB was also manufactured under the Ion Audio brand name.

Product features 

 Anti-skating control 
 33-1/3 and 45RPM playback speeds
 ±10% adjustable pitch control
 RCA line outputs
 USB output
 1/8" stereo minijack input
 Moving magnet phono cartridge

Notes

External links 
 TTUSB on the Numark website

Turntables